opened in Kagoshima, Kagoshima Prefecture, Japan, in 1989, the centenary of the City's official foundation. Located on a hill overlooking Sakurajima and Kagoshima Bay, at an elevation of 110 metres, the Museum's collection of some thousand objects amassed by businessman , includes works by Kuroda Seiki, Rodin, and Chagall, as well as Satsuma ware.

See also
 Kagoshima City Museum of Art
 Reimeikan, Kagoshima Prefectural Center for Historical Material
 List of Cultural Properties of Japan - paintings (Kagoshima)

References

External links
  Nagashima Museum

Museums in Kagoshima Prefecture
Buildings and structures in Kagoshima
Art museums and galleries in Japan
Museums established in 1989
1989 establishments in Japan